"Runaway Train" is a song written by John Stewart, and recorded by American country music artist Rosanne Cash.  It was released in July 1988 as the fourth single from the album King's Record Shop.  The song was Cash's ninth number one on the country chart as a solo artist.  The single went to number one for one week and spent a total of 14 weeks within the top 40.

John Stewart released his own version on his 1987 album Punch the Big Guy.

Mary Chapin Carpenter also recorded the song for her debut album Hometown Girl, but her version of it did not make the final cut.

Charts

Weekly charts

Year-end charts

References
 

1988 singles
1987 songs
Rosanne Cash songs
Songs written by John Stewart (musician)
Columbia Records singles
Song recordings produced by Rodney Crowell
Mary Chapin Carpenter songs